Delia Grigore (Romani: Deliya Grigore; born February 7, 1972) is a Romanian Romani writer, philologist, academic, and Romani rights activist.

Biography 
Delia Grigore was born in Galați and grew up under the Romanian communist regime, when the Roma were not recognized as an ethnic group, but as foreign elements that must assimilate in Romanian society. During that time, her family hid their real identity so as to avoid discrimination. After the Romanian Revolution of 1989  she could reassert her Romani ethnicity and relearn the language. In 1990, she completed secondary studies at the Zoia Kosmodemianskaia High School in Bucharest, while in 1992 she graduated the Sanskrit Language and Indian Old Civilization and Culture course from the University of Bucharest. In 1995 she obtained a degree in Romanian and English philology from the Faculty of Philology at the University of Bucharest. Since 2000, Delia Grigore has published a series of writings about Romani culture and language.

In 2002 she obtained a Doctorate in the Anthropology of the Romani culture with the Ph.D. thesis Family Customs of the Rromani Traditional Culture with Nomadic Identity Pattern in the South East of Romania. Currently she teaches in the Department of Foreign Languages and Literatures at the University of Bucharest. She also became involved in the defense of Romani rights as the president of the Association ȘATRA/A.S.T.R.A. – "Amare Rromentza".

In February 2002, Delia Grigore requested that the Romanian state authorities and the leadership of the Romanian Orthodox Church acknowledge their responsibility for the enforcement and the consequences of five centuries of slavery of the Romani people in the historical Romanian states of Wallachia and Moldavia.

Writings 
 Siklioven i Rromani chib - Ghid de limbă și cultură rromani "Learn Rromani language - Guidelines of Rromani Language and Culture" (2000, Aven Amentza, Bucharest)
 Rromanipen-ul (rromani dharma) și mistica familiei "Rromanipen (Rromani Dharma) and the Family Mystics" (2001, Salvați copiii, Bucharest)
 Introducere în studiul culturii tradiționale rromani - Curs de antropologie rromani "Introduction in the Study of Rromani Traditional Culture - Course of Rromani Anthropology" (2001, CREDIS, University of Bucharest)
 Rromii: tipuri și arhetipuri identitare "Rroma: Identity Types and Archetypes" a chapter in Rromii și cultura populară română. Patrin thai iag "Rroma and the Romanian Folk Culture. Leaf and fire" (2002, Aven Amentza, Bucharest), coordinator: Vasile Ionescu
 Istoria și tradițiile minorității rromani "History and Traditions of the Rromani Minority" (2005, Sigma, Bucharest), written together with Petre Petcuț and Mariana Sandu

See also
Roma minority in Romania

References

External links 
 Curriculum vitae (until about 2003)

1972 births
Living people
People from Galați
Romanian Romani people
Romani activists
Romanian human rights activists
Romanian philologists
Romanian women writers
Romanian women essayists
Women philologists
Women human rights activists
University of Bucharest alumni
Academic staff of the University of Bucharest